Pauma Valley (Pauma, Luiseño for "place where there is water") is a geographic valley and unincorporated community between Valley Center and Palomar Mountain in San Diego County, California.  The name also refers to the agricultural region comprising citrus and avocado groves, and the location of several Indian Reservations, a country club, and tribal casinos.

California Route 76 crosses the length of the Pauma Valley and through the community of Pauma Valley, on its route between the coast in Oceanside and California Route 79 near Warner Springs. The valley is at the western base of the Palomar Mountains.

The headquarters of the Pauma Band of Luiseno Mission Indians and La Jolla Band of Luiseno Indians are located in Pauma Valley.

See also
Pala Indian Reservation
Pala, California
Mission Indians

External links
Pauma Valley Country Club

References

Valleys of San Diego County, California
Unincorporated communities in San Diego County, California
Palomar Mountains
North County (San Diego County)
Unincorporated communities in California